The Department of Agriculture, Fisheries and Forestry (DAFF) was an Australian government department that existed between 1998 and 2013, when it was renamed as the Department of Agriculture. DAFF's role was to develop and implement policies and programs that ensure Australia's agricultural, fisheries, food and forestry industries remained competitive, profitable and sustainable.

DAFF policies and programs were to:
 encourage and support sustainable natural resource use and management 
 protect the health and safety of plant and animal industries 
 enable industries to adapt to compete in a fast-changing international and economic environment
 help improve market access and market performance for the agricultural and food sector 
 encourage and assist industries to adopt new technology and practices 
 assist primary producers and the food industry to develop business and marketing skills, and to be financially self-reliant.

Scope 
DAFF facilitated the development of self-reliant, profitable, competitive and sustainable Australian farm businesses and industries. Through consultation with industry, DAFF developed and implemented policies and programs that helped to assure product safety and integrity. Particular emphasis was placed on on-farm risk management that related to food safety.

Divisions which fell within the broader department included: Sustainable Resource Management (Fisheries), Climate Change (Drought Assistance, Australia's Farming Future, Forestry), Agricultural Productivity (FarmReady, Animal Welfare, Crops Horticulture & Wine, Food) and Trade & Market Access (Free Trade Agreements). DAFF's Biosecurity function, which was previously performed by AQIS, managed quarantine controls at Australia's borders to minimise the risk of exotic pests and diseases entering the country. DAFF also provided import and export inspection and certification to help retain Australia’s highly favourable animal, plant and human health status and wide access to overseas export markets.

At its creation, the department dealt with the following principal matters:
Agricultural, pastoral, fishing, food and forest industries 
Water, soils and other natural resources 
Rural adjustment and drought issues 
Rural industries inspection and quarantine 
Primary industries research including economic research 
Commodity marketing, including export promotion end agribusiness 
Commodity-specific international organisations and activities 
Administration of international commodity agreements
Administration of export controls on agricultural, fisheries and forestry industries products
Food policy, processing and exports

Biosecurity role

DAFF managed quarantine controls at Australia's borders to minimise the risk of exotic pests and diseases entering the country. DAFF also provided import and export inspection and certification to help retain Australia's highly favourable animal, plant and human health status and wide access to overseas export markets.

DAFF continuously looked to improve the effectiveness of the quarantine effort by working closely with other areas within DAFF to manage Australia's biosecurity system. The Department also worked closely with other Australian Government agencies – such as Australian Customs and Border Protection Service, Department of Health and Ageing, Food Standards Australia and New Zealand (FSANZ) and state/territory governments – to support their management of post–border detections and incursions of quarantine pests and diseases, and to support our own verification and certification activities for agriculture and food products.

Previous agencies 

Department of Primary Industry (11 January 1956 – 2 June 1974)
Department of Agriculture (12 June 1974 – 22 December 1975)
Department of Primary Industry (22 December 1975 – 24 July 1987)
Department of Primary Industries and Energy (24 July 1987 – 21 October 1998)

Subsequent agencies 
Department of Agriculture (18 September 2013 – 21 September 2015)
Department of Agriculture and Water Resources (21 September 2015 – 29 May 2019)

References

Ministries established in 1998
Agriculture, Fisheries and Forestry
Department of Agriculture, Fisheries and Forestry